Rasbihari Desai (1935 – 2012), who was fondly called Rasbhai, even by himself , was a renowned vocalist and composer of Gujarati and Hindi songs. He had a deep sonorous voice.  He lived up to what he used to say – “Sureelo kanth, sureelu-n jeevan (A Melodious Voice, A Melodious Life).” A knowledgeable professor of physics, he remained steeped in spirituality.

He did not receive any formal training in music. He had a natural genius for it. He had the ear to notice the finer qualities of singing that gave it character and the voice that made them his own. Reading enriched his repertoire and interpretation. He took care to constantly expose himself to genuine poetry and to pronounce its words correctly, retaining the Dhwani that gave them their distinctive aural beauty.  He was gifted with that rare quality of voice we call Kharaj – notes in the lowest octave - rising from within and through sustenance assuming meditative depth and dignity. He accepted having been encouraged and inspired by Sooryakant Dave, Suresh Jani and Purushottam Upadhyay.

Early life 
He was born to Durgaba and Ramanlal Desai of a respectable Nagar family in Patan (North Gujarat). His grandmother Mahalaxmiben used to sing Ramcharitmanas fully in her flowing expressive voice. Father Ramanbhai was a singer of repute too. Rasbhai was married in 1964 to Vibha, who had the distinction of having been recognized as a national level singer by All India Radio. She went on to receive the Best Female Playback Singer Award (1989) for the film ‘Kashino Dikro’, still regarded as a milestone in the history of Gujarati cinema. In the music world, Vibha and Rasbihari Desai remained complementary names. Together they gave over 1,000 performances in Gujarat, outside Gujarat as also abroad.

Career 
At the age of 19, Rasbihari had the distinction of being All India Radio approved vocalist in light music to be upgraded in course of time to the Top Grade. AIR, and later Doordarshan, regularly invited him to concerts all over India.  He remained the nucleus of musical activities throughout his academic career as a professor of Physics and it was often that talents finely honed by him claimed top places at the university and national levels.  For training to students for inter-university events, he was almost always invited.
At numerous music-orientation camps and workshops organized by the Gujarat University and Government of Gujarat to mould budding singers, he diligently and insightfully followed the indigenous traditional method of imparting training in music. Pranayama, dhyana, breath-controlling exercises, prayers, poetry recitation and appreciation, a scientific approach to developing voice culture and an emphasis on experiencing the divine through it were integral to his interactive music sessions. He conducted such lecture demonstrations and workshops in the United Kingdom and the United States as well. Again, reminiscent of our Parampara, going back to ancient times, quite a few students in his lifetime were welcome to stay in his family, observe and emulate his lifestyle and learn music in the spirit of a sadhana, experiencing the bliss, the ambience and his dedication offered.

Shruti Vrunda
Rasbihari Desai was instrumental in the formation of Shruti, a group of non-professional proficient trained singers, which in course of time emerged as the benchmark in group singing with a fragrance of the soil in the songs and a refreshing spontaneity in rendering them.

For over 40 years Shruti gave more than 300 performances in Gujarat, Mumbai, Delhi, Nagpur, Kolkata and other places. Music maestros like Lata Mangeshkar, Hridaynath Mangeshkar, Salil Chaudhary, Madan Mohan, Manna Dey, Mohammed Rafi, Laxmikant Pyarelal and Avinash Vyas were among those who highly commended Shruti's significant tenacious endeavour.

Bhavan's Sangeet Vibhag 
At the instance of Kanaiyalal Munshi, a leading author, a political leader and the founder of Bharatiya Vidya Bhavan, Rasbihari Desai consented to be the mentor of Bhavan's Sangeet Vibhag in 1967 and continued the activity consistently for over 43 years. Under his guidance it significantly contributed to Gujarati Kavya Sangeet and Choir Singing. He inculcated in his students having different voices and varying degrees of proficiency, a sense of dedication to music and humility to let individual identity melt and help the group grow.

Thought provoking lectures-demonstrations and articles 
Rasbihari Desai enriched Gujarati Kavya Sangeet not only with his melodious voice and lilting compositions but also with his thought-provoking lectures and demonstrations and articles. Vision, Reason, and Precision were the integral elements of his thought process that lent originality and effective expression to his speeches and writings. He was invited to deliver speeches and lectures and demonstrations at various prestigious seminars, conferences, and workshops on music. His conceptual and innovative articles got published in a number of leading newspapers and magazines.

Lecture-demonstrations / workshops / seminars 
 In M.S. University, Baroda on "Kavya Sangeet".
 In University of Texas at Austin, USA on "Characteristics of Indian Music".
 Invited by All India Radio,Ahmedabad for delivering a lecture in a 'Workshop On Indian Music' to the Program- Executives/ Composers from various AIR stations in Gujarat, Rajasthan, Madhya Pradesh, Uttar Pradesh & Haryana in September, 2005.
 Organized & conducted Gujarat State Sugam Sangeet Conferences since 1971.
 Conducted more than 20, ten days intensive orientation music-camps(Shibirs) of Gujarat State Government Youth Board and Gujarat University.
 A Sanskrit Shloka-Mantra Gaan Workshop for Gujarat Uni. students.

Articles / publications in music 
 Article published in "Kumar" monthly in 1967. 
 "Music in Gujarat" extensive survey article in 13th Anniversary Supplement of The Times of India on February 9, 1981.
 "Music - A Kaleidoscopic View" Article in The Times of India Annual Supplement.
 A series of 3 articles in the reputed Daily " Gujarat Samachar" London Edition.
 Articles on "Musical Bird-Calls" in the Gujarati magazine "Kumar" in October 2001 & Hindi magazine "Sangeet", Hathras, Uttar Pradesh in December 2004.

Concluding phase of life 
Rasbhai was precise and low profile as much in speaking as in writing. The books he read, and he read many, reflected his ardent love for music and spiritual explorations.
Shri Dhyani Maharaj Madhusudandasji was his spiritual Guru. He thought himself fortunate to be in live touch with the enlightened personalities like Shri Chidanandaji of Shivananda Ashram, Pramukhswami Maharaj  and Shri Vimlatai Thakar through correspondence.
All said, music remained an instrument of a spiritual ascent to him. Spirituality was nurtured in him since his childhood by his Foima (Father's sister) Nirmalaben Desai, an affectionate and learned lady who used to tell him inspiring stories from Indian scriptures. His young inquisitive eyes also witnessed some such incidents that cannot be interpreted by mere intellect. The imprints of these childhood memories evoked an urge in him to seek the infinite.

Some of the experiences Rasbihari himself recounted go beyond the realm of spirituality and have an element of mysticism about them.

A couple of days before his marriage, he had for two days remained engaged in a cloud chamber experiment in the darkroom of the physics lab of his college, Gujarat College. It is difficult to say when and how he slipped from the domain of physics to the one of spirituality. His relations assert he did. His individual consciousness became one with the universal consciousness, it was believed.

On his return on the evening of 27 May 1964, he explained his absence for two days to the worried family and added that in the state of meditation, he had an intuitive communication that the then Prime Minister of India Pandit Jawaharlal Nehru had passed away and it indeed was true. Another such incident took place in the year 2007 when while singing in his Pooja room, he heard a voice, different from his own voice. The immense melody of that divine and blissful voice was so overwhelming that he could not help praying to the Almighty to cease his own voice so that only the divine voice could be heard forever.

The prayer was answered in 2012. On October 6, his voice ceased to mingle with the divine. He left this ethereal world to merge with the eternal melody. The then Chief Minister of Gujarat Shri Narendra Modi along with the renowned personalities from the field of literature and music expressed deep shock and grief. .A great homage was also paid to him by the electronic as well as print media.

A Parichay Pustika by Image Publication titled Rasbihari Desai written by Margi Hathi was released by Shri Morari Bapu in the inaugural ceremony of Kavya Sangeet Samaroh- 2013 jointly organized by Gujarat Samachar and Samanvay.

A place near his residence is named “ Sangeetkar Rasbihari Desai Chowk “‘ by the Ahmedabad Municipal Corporation as a mark of respect for his unforgettable and valuable contribution in Gujarati Kavya Sangeet.

An Award has been floated in his memory since 2014. Sangat Prerit Shri Rasbihari Desai Sanman is conferred every year to a prominent Gujarati Singer in Anushthan, concert of Gujarati music.

Awards and accolades

Recognition 
 Best playback singer in the Gujarati film ' Kashino Dikro' by the Govt of Gujarat in 1979.
 Awarded honorary membership of Gujarati association of Detroit of United States for remarkable contribution in the field of music in 1981.
 'Triveni' award by Triveni Vadodara for outstanding contribution to music in 1984.
 Gaurav Puraskar by the Govt of Gujarat for the year 1991–92.
 'Anart' Award by Mehsana (5 northern district of Gujarat State) in 1995.
 Vishishta Dirgha Prasaran Seva Award ( since 1954 ) by All India Radio in 1998.
 Inclusion as a couple in the first 100 leading personalities of Gujarat declared by the reputed daily Divya Bhaskar.
 'Hridayasth Avinash Vyas Sugam Sangeet Award' inspired by Morari Bapu in February 2012.
 Felicitated as a Couple for the remarkable contribution in Gujarati Sugam Sangeet by the Municipal Corporation, Ahmedabad in 2012

Achievements 
 Lead singer in 15 musical ballets produced by All India Radio, Ahmedabad from 1959 to 1983.
 Co-Organiser of music conferences under the auspices of Bhartiya Vidya Bhavan, Mumbai from 1960 to 1966.
 Lead singer in 18 dance ballets in various academic institutions from 1960 to 1980.
 Professor in charge of Gujarat University cultural team which visited Indore & Ujjain Universities, Madhya Pradesh in 1971; Kurukshetra & Hissar Universities, Haryana in 1972 & Karnataka & Mysore Universities, Mysore in 1973.
 Participated in National seminar on musicology with special reference to ' Musical Scales ', sponsored by Central Sangeet Natak Academy, Delhi in collaboration with Department of Physics & Department of Music, University of Madras on 26 to 28 February 1979.
 Represented Gujarat University as an observer in International Seminar on ' Indian Music Insight ' at Bhopal on 27 to 30 September 1983.
 Given lectures in Center for Developmental Communications, Gujarat University on the subject ' Bhartiya Sangeet Parampara '  in 1984–1985.
 Presented light music in ' Lata Mangeshkar Puraskar Alankaran Samaroh' on invitation by Madhya Pradesh Government, held on 3 February 1988.
 Conducted 25 music orientation camps (Shibirs) / Sammelans of Gujarat University students & winners of Gujarat state youth festival.
 Nominated by the Director General, All India Radio, New Delhi to be a member of Local Audition Committee (Folk & Light Music) in February 2005 for two years.

Discs and albums 
 Mandava-ni- jui ( HMV, first ever Trio with Purushottam Upadhyay & Pinakin Mehta.
 Shravan Madhuri ( LP record of Shruti vrund- HMV)
 Ne Tame Yaad Aavyan - (LP Record)
 Bilipatra- Trinetra ( Sanskrit CD Album )
 Radha Madhav Leela Gaan, Atma Nivedan ( Hindi Devotionals - CD Albums )
 Ashram Bhajanavali ( Devotional Album )
 Keertan Mala ( Devotional Album)
 Ame komal komal (CD Album)
 Kashi- no- Dikro (CD Album - Gujarati Movie )
 Leeludi Dharati (CD Album - Gujarati Movie )
 Hothal Padamani  (CD Album- Gujarati Movie )
 Sayujya ( 2 CD Album )
 Sangeet- Sudha ( CD Album )
 Shiv- Mahimna - Vishnu Sahasra Naam  ( CD Album )
 Guru Ne Baat Sunaya ( Kabirvani )
 Anahad Na Ajwala (CD Album ) ( His Compositions )
 Smaran Na Ajwala ( CD Album) ( His Compositions )

References 

1935 births
2012 deaths
People from Patan district
20th-century Indian composers
21st-century Indian composers
20th-century Indian singers
21st-century Indian singers